is a former Japanese football player and manager.

Playing career
Mizushima was born in Tokyo on 10 September 1964. In 1975, when he was 10 years old, he moved to Brazil and he joined São Paulo youth team. In 1984, he signed with top team. After that, he played for São Bento, Portuguesa Desportos and Santos. In 1989, he returned to Japan and joined Hitachi. In 1991, he moved to All Nippon Airways (later Yokohama Flügels). However he could hardly play in the match for injury and he retired end of 1992 season.

Coaching career
In 2014, Mizushima signed with Fujieda MYFC and managed the club in 1 season.

In 2019, he worked as assistant coach at the Tajikistan national football team

Club statistics

Managerial statistics

References

External links

1964 births
Living people
Association football people from Tokyo
Japanese footballers
Japan Soccer League players
J1 League players
Santos FC players
São Paulo FC players
Kashiwa Reysol players
Yokohama Flügels players
Japanese expatriate footballers
Expatriate footballers in Brazil
Japanese football managers
J3 League managers
Fujieda MYFC managers
Association football midfielders